Visionary Music Group is an American independent record label & management company, founded by Chris Zarou.  The label's roster includes Logic and Jon Bellion, among others. In 2018, Visionary Music Group partnered with management company Mutual Friends which resulted in Quinn XCII, Chelsea Cutler, Jeremy Zucker, Ayokay, and 6ix being added to its roster.

Early days 
After frequent Facebook messages and visits to Logic's home in Maryland, Zarou convinced the rapper to let him take the reins of his career and soon convinced him to sign to Visionary. Zarou had no prior experience in the music industry. Logic was the first artist signed to the label. Shortly after, Zarou was contacted by singer Jon Bellion who was in need of management. At first, Zarou declined to work with Bellion due to his increasing schedule with Logic. However, Bellion was determined to have the young executive guide his career rather than the industry veterans who had been trying to recruit him. Zarou eventually agreed to take the vocalist on as a client.

References

2010 establishments in Maryland
American record labels
Hip hop record labels